Demetrij Žebre (22 December 1912 – 13 March 1970) was a Slovenian composer. His work was part of the music event in the art competition at the 1936 Summer Olympics.

References

1912 births
1970 deaths
Slovenian composers
Male composers
Olympic competitors in art competitions
Musicians from Ljubljana
Slovenian male musicians